Fiorella Valverde Salazar (born 22 January 1989) is a Peruvian footballer who plays as a goalkeeper for Sporting Cristal and the Peru women's national team.

International career
Valverde capped for Peru at senior level during the 2010 South American Women's Football Championship.

References

1989 births
Living people
Peruvian women's footballers
Women's association football goalkeepers
Peru women's international footballers